The International Journal of Neural Systems is a bimonthly peer-reviewed scientific journal founded in 1989. It is published by World Scientific and covers information processing in natural and artificial neural systems.

Abstracting and indexing 
The journal is abstracted and indexed in:
 Inspec
 PubMed
 CSA Neurosciences Abstracts
 Zentralblatt MATH
 Science Citation Index Expanded
 CompuMath Citation Index
 Current Contents/Engineering, Computing, and Technology

Publications established in 1989
Neuroscience journals
World Scientific academic journals
English-language journals
Bimonthly journals